is an illustrator, game creator, character designer and animator born on November 21, 1961 in Yonago, Tottori Prefecture, Japan.

Career history

Akai attended Osaka University of Arts majoring in fine art . While studying there, Akai created the character designs for the Daicon III opening animation. The main staff for the Daicon III and Daicon IV opening animations went on to create the animation studio Gainax. Akai was in the same class as Hiroyuki Yamaga and Hideaki Anno.

He was a board member of Gainax. His wife is Kimiko Higuchi. He stepped down from Gainax board after an incident in which he and another employee made disparaging remarks about fan criticisms made on the Japanese Internet forum 2channel. He runs his own company titled NineLives. 

He is portrayed by actor Tomoya Nakamura in the 2014 TV Drama Aoi Honō based on the autobiographical manga by his fellow Osaka University of Arts alumnus Kazuhiko Shimamoto.

Works
Aikoku Sentai Dai-Nippon
Akai Takami Works
Banner of the Stars (anime, character designs)
Crest of the Stars (anime, character designs)
Dennō Gakuen
Magical Pop'n (package artwork)
Kaettekita Ultraman (Daicon Film)
Petite Princess Yucie (anime, original story, character design)
Princess Maker (game, character design, director)
Royal Space Force: The Wings of Honneamise
Tengen Toppa Gurren Lagann
Yamata no Orochi no Gyakushū

See also
Ath (alphabet)
Baronh
Gainax

References

External links

 
NineLives Official Site
Gainax Net
 Akai interview
 Gurren Lagann interview
 Lagann, Daicon interview

1961 births
Living people
Gainax
Japanese animators
Anime character designers
Artists from Tottori Prefecture
Osaka University of Arts alumni
People from Yonago, Tottori